Ralph Neville, 2nd Baron Neville of Raby (c. 1291 – 5 August 1367) was an English aristocrat, the son of Ralph Neville, 1st Baron Neville de Raby by Eupheme de Clavering.

Neville led the English forces to victory against King David II of Scotland at the Battle of Neville's Cross on 17 October 1346.

Marriage and children 

He married Alice de Audley (d. 1358), daughter of Hugh de Audley, 1st Baron Audley of Stratton Audley and Isolde le Rous (and widow of Ralph de Greystoke, 1st Baron Greystoke (died 1323)), on 14 Jan 1326 with whom he had thirteen children:
 Euphemia Neville (c. 1327 – 1394), married firstly in 1344 Robert Clifford, 4th Baron Clifford, secondly Reynold [Reginald]Lucy, son of Thomas Baron Lucy and thirdly Walter Heselarton, knight.
 John Neville, 3rd Baron Neville de Raby (1322/8–17 October 1388), married firstly Maud Percy and secondly Elizabeth Latimer and had issue with both
 Margaret Neville (12 February 1329 – 12 May 1372), married firstly William de Ros, 3rd Baron de Ros, by whom she had no issue, and secondly Henry Percy, 1st Earl of Northumberland, by whom she had issue. She also married Sir Jean William 6th Earl De Ross with issue.
 Catherine Neville (c. 1330 – 1 September 1361), married William Dacre, 2nd Baron Dacre of Gillesland
 Sir Ralph Neville (c. 1332 – c. 1380), married Elizabeth de Ledes
 Robert Neville of Eldon (c. 1337), married Clara Pinckney
 William Neville (c. 1338 – c. 1391), married firstly Elizabeth Le Waleys and secondly Alice de St Philbert
 Eleanor Neville (c. 1340), married Geoffrey Scrope
 Alexander Neville (c. 1341 – 1392), Archbishop of York
 Elizabeth Neville (c. 1343)
 Isabel Neville (c. 1344), married Hugh FitzHugh FitzHenry
 Thomas Neville (c. 1355)
 Alice Neville

Notes

References

External links
 Ralph Neville, 2nd Baron Nevill of Raby

1290s births
1367 deaths
Year of birth uncertain
13th-century English nobility
14th-century English nobility
Barons Neville of Raby
Ralph, 2nd Baron Neville
People of the Wars of Scottish Independence